A shimmy is a dance move

Shimmy may also refer to:
 Shimmy (TV series), a belly dance instructional television series
 Speed wobble, an oscillating instability in vehicle steering wheels
 Shimmy, a common nickname for the Hebrew name Shimon

Music
 Shimmy Disc, record label founded in 1987 by Mark Kramer
 "Shimmy" (song), covered by Preeya Kalidas and Mumzy Stranger
 "Shimmy", a song by System of a Down from the album Toxicity
 "Shimmy", a song by Bruce Morrow L. Hampton, B. Morrow, 1962
 "Shimmy", a song by Lee Allen And Band, 1956
 "Shimmy", a song by Toussaint McCall, 1972
 "Shimmy", a song by Aminé, 2020
"Shimmy", a song by K.O from the album "Pty Unld", 2019
 "Shimmy", a song by Lil Wayne featuring Doja Cat from the album Funeral
 "Shimmy Shimmy Ya", a 1995 song by Ol' Dirty Bastard

People 
 Shimmy Marcus (born 1966), Irish filmmaker